The women's synchronized 10 metre platform diving competition at the 2010 Asian Games in Guangzhou was held on 23 November at the Aoti Aquatics Centre.

Schedule
All times are China Standard Time (UTC+08:00)

Results

References 

Results

External links
Results

Diving at the 2010 Asian Games